Spodnje Prapreče is a village near Lukovica pri Domžalah in the eastern part of the Upper Carniola region of Slovenia.

Church

The local church is dedicated to Saint Luke and dates to the early 16th century.

References

External links

Spodnje Prapreče on Geopedia

Populated places in the Municipality of Lukovica